This is an incomplete list of caves in China. It includes natural caves and rock cut grottoes.

Natural caves

Buddhist grottoes

See also
 List of caves
 Speleology

References

China
Caves
Caves